Wang Jiajie (Chinese: 汪佳捷; Pinyin: Wāng Jiājié; born 15 November 1988 in Shanghai) is a Chinese football player who currently plays for Kunshan FC as a defensive midfielder or centre-back.

Club career
Born in Shanghai, Wang joined Genbao Football Academy in 2000. He left the academy played for several China League Two clubs including Shanghai Wicrrun (later Zhenjiang Groupway), Suzhou Trips and Ningbo Huaao between 2004 and 2009. He returned to Shanghai East Asia in 2010. He became the regular player of the team in 2011. On 2 June 2012, he scored his first goal for Shanghai East Asia in the second round of 2012 Chinese FA Cup which Shanghai beat Fujian Smart Hero 6–0. His first league goal for Shanghai came on 26 August, in a 3–0 home victory against Tianjin Songjiang. Wang made 28 league appearances in the 2012 season, as Shanghai East Asia won the championship and promotion to the top flight.

On 31 January 2018, Wang was loaned to China League One side Shanghai Shenxin until 31 December 2018. On 2 March 2019, Wang was loaned to League Two side Kunshan FC for the 2019 season and was part of the team that gained promotion to the second tier at the end of the 2019 China League Two campaign. Going on to remain at Kunshan, he would go on to establish himself as regular within the team and was part of the squad that won the division and promotion to the top tier at the end of the 2022 China League One campaign.

Career statistics 
Statistics accurate as of match played 31 December 2020.

Honours

Club
Shanghai East Asia
 China League One: 2012

Kunshan
 China League One: 2022

References

External links
 

1988 births
Living people
Chinese footballers
Footballers from Shanghai
Shanghai Port F.C. players
Shanghai Shenxin F.C. players
Kunshan F.C. players
Chinese Super League players
China League One players
China League Two players
Association football midfielders